The 2016 Bass Pro Shops NRA Night Race was a NASCAR Sprint Cup Series stock car race held on August 20–21, 2016 at Bristol Motor Speedway in Bristol, Tennessee. 48 laps were completed during the evening of August 20 before the race was stopped due to rain and completed on August 21, 2016. Contested over 500 laps on the  short track, it was the 23rd race of the 2016 NASCAR Sprint Cup Series season.

Kevin Harvick scored his third win of the season, The race had eight lead changes among different drivers and nine cautions for 106 laps, as well as 3 red flags for a total of 18 hours, 21 minutes and 4 seconds.

Report

Background

The Bristol Motor Speedway, formerly known as Bristol International Raceway and Bristol Raceway, is a NASCAR short track venue located in Bristol, Tennessee. Constructed in 1960, it held its first NASCAR race on July 30, 1961. Despite its short length, Bristol is among the most popular tracks on the NASCAR schedule because of its distinct features, which include extraordinarily steep banking, an all concrete surface, two pit roads, and stadium-like seating. It has also been named one of the loudest NASCAR tracks.

Entry list
The preliminary entry list for the race included 40 cars and was released on August 15, 2016 at 9:25 a.m. Eastern time.

Practice

First practice

Final practice

Qualifying

He stated afterwards that his chances of sweeping Bristol after sweeping both poles "is good. The car is very fast. Our team just responds to anything thrown at us. (Crew chief) Dave Rogers isn’t afraid to make changes. We will see if we can finish this deal tomorrow night and be talking about how we were able to do it in the race."

I think we did all we could. We just came up a tiny bit short."

"Third is a pretty solid place to start," Kyle Busch said after qualifying third. "Our car handled well today. Of course the pole position would’ve been awesome, but we’ll take third and give it our best shot tomorrow night."

Qualifying results

Race

First half

The start of the race was delayed by rain and lightning in the vicinity of the speedway for nearly 30 minutes. The drivers were called to their cars at 8:40 p.m. and rolled off pit road around 8:57. Under night Tennessee skies, Carl Edwards led the field to the green flag at 9:03. Teammate Denny Hamlin got a much better start and led the first lap. Chase Elliott worked his way up to Hamlin and passed him for the lead on the ninth lap. Kyle Busch reeled him in to pass under him in turn 4 to take the lead on lap 23. The first caution of the race flew on lap 30 for rain. It picked up in intensity to the point that the race was red-flagged on lap 38. The red flag period lasted for one hour, 24 minutes and four seconds before engines were refired at 10:42 and the cars rolled back onto the track. After eight laps riding around, the rain returned with greater intensity and the race was red-flagged a second time at lap 48. Just past 11:00, the rest of the race was postponed to Sunday at 1:00 p.m.

The drivers were called to their cars, the red flag was withdrawn and the race resumed under caution at 4:33 p.m. on Sunday, August 21. The race restarted on lap 58. Half the field was running the bottom line of the track while the other half was running the high line. The field largely rode around until the second caution of the race flew on lap 85. It was a planned competition caution. Brian Scott opted not to pit under the caution and assumed the lead. Kyle Larson and Ricky Stenhouse Jr. were both tagged for speeding on pit road and restarted the race from the tail end of the field.

The race restarted on lap 91. Ryan Newman edged out Scott at the line to take the lead on lap 92. Busch drove around Newman on the high line to retake the lead on lap 102. The third caution of the race flew on lap 158 for a single-car wreck in turn 2 involving Regan Smith. Edwards exited pit road with the race lead.

The race restarted on lap 165. Edwards sat in command of the race for 27 laps before Busch took back the lead on lap 193. Debris in turn 3 brought the fourth caution of the race on lap 254.

Second half

The race restarted on lap 262. Kevin Harvick took the lead for the first time on lap 288. The fifth caution of the race flew on lap 308 for a single-car spin by Kyle Larson in turn 4. Hamlin was tagged for speeding and restarted the race from the tail end of the field.

The race restarted on lap 316. Busch controlled the race for the next 32 laps before losing the lead to Harvick on lap 348. Busch radioed to his team that a part on his car had failed. His car got loose going into turn 1, slid down the track, turned back up the track and came to a stop backwards. Justin Allgaier, driving in place of Michael Annett, clipped the left-front of Busch's car. He went up the track and collected Larson and Martin Truex Jr., which brought out the sixth caution. Busch said afterwards that the part failure was "a shame. The last few times we’ve been here, we’ve had really fast M&M’s Toyota Camrys and we haven’t been able to finish. We’ve been having parts failures here, so something we’ve got to address and fix. I’m really tired of losing races here with parts falling apart, so they’ll hear about it on Tuesday." He also said that the "biggest moron out there is the spotter of the 46 and the driver of the 46 (Justin Allgaier). I’ve been wrecking for half a lap and they just come on through and clean us out. That’s stupid, so I don’t know – frustrating day. Let’s go home." Allgaier went on to finish 40th. Kurt Busch assumed the race lead.

The race restarted with 129 laps to go and a multi-car wreck brought out the seventh caution of the race. It started when Busch spun out and collected Brad Keselowski. Matt Kenseth, Paul Menard, Ryan Blaney, Jimmie Johnson and Elliott all suffered damage in the wreck. Busch said afterwards that he thought he "just missed the bottom groove by a few inches, got loose and the wreck was on. The way that our car was restarting it felt comfortable, it felt good. That inside with the rosin and the VHT, if you don’t hit it exactly right you lose a lot of time. I tried to make up for it and got loose. I feel really bad for the Monster Energy guys. We had a win in our sights and I just drove the car at 101 percent instead of that 99 that I probably needed to be at." Joey Logano assumed the race lead.

The race restarted with 111 laps to go. Harvick took the lead back from Logano with 95 laps to go. The eighth caution of the race flew when Clint Bowyer got into the wall. Hamlin exited pit road with the race lead.

The race restarted with 77 laps to go. The ninth caution of the race flew with 55 laps to go for rain. The cars were brought back down pit road as the race was red-flagged for a third time. After six minutes and 54 seconds, the race resumed under caution.

The race restarted with 51 laps. Harvick drove on to score the victory.

Post-race

Driver comments
Harvick said afterwards that he thought his team had "a good plan. I think we have great cars, and we've made a lot of adjustments. ... Hopefully this win and everything getting ready to start with the Chase is going to put all the pieces together, and I think everybody has been working hard to do that." In regards to the double burnout he did with Tony Stewart following the race, he said he "wanted him to go on a victory lap with so he could say goodbye to all the fans here at Bristol but that was pretty cool doing some burnouts with him."

Stenhouse, who tied a career-best Sprint Cup Series finish with a runner-up finish in a special paint scheme dedicated to the late Bryan Clauson, said afterwards that he "knew we were going to have to get everything perfect, and it took me a minute to get the top going. I wanted to give up when we were two [laps] down, but I remembered we had Bryan Clauson’s tribute car here, and his favorite helmet, and I dug deep and the guys dug deep and made a lost of changes that made our Fastenal Ford a lot better. We really wanted to park it in Victory Lane for his whole family and all of his friends and fans for Tim, Di, Taylor and Lauren his fiancée… Just a little bit short."

Hamlin, who recovered from a speeding penalty and loose wheel to finish third, said he "had a great car. We definitely got it a lot better there at the end and proud that we’re able to come back from two laps down and get a good finish out of it, but still a good overall day for our FedEx Express Camry. Just came up a little short."

Race results

Race summary
 Lead changes: 8 among different drivers
 Cautions/Laps: 9 for 106
 Red flags: 3 for 18 hours, 21 minutes and 4 seconds
 Time of race: 3 hours, 25 minutes and 5 seconds
 Average speed:

Media

Television
NBC Sports covered the race on the television side. Rick Allen, Jeff Burton and Steve Letarte had the call in the booth for the race. Dave Burns, Parker Kligerman, Mike Massaro and Marty Snider reported from pit lane during the race.

Radio
The Performance Racing Network had the radio call for the race, which was simulcast on Sirius XM NASCAR Radio.

Standings after the race

Note: Only the first 16 positions are included for the driver standings.. – Driver has clinched a position in the Chase for the Sprint Cup.

References

2016 in sports in Tennessee
2016 NASCAR Sprint Cup Series
August 2016 sports events in the United States
NASCAR races at Bristol Motor Speedway